NGC 457 (also designated Caldwell 13, and known as the Dragonfly Cluster, E.T. Cluster, Owl Cluster, Kachina Doll Cluster or Phi Cassiopeiae Cluster) is an open star cluster in the constellation Cassiopeia.

Discovery 
It was discovered by William Herschel on August 18, 1780, with a 6.2 inch reflector telescope, and catalogued as VII 42.

Visibility 
It is an easy target for amateur astronomers, and can be seen even with small telescopes in light-polluted skies.

Characteristics 
It lies over 7,900 light years away from the Sun. It has an estimated age of 21 million years. The cluster is sometimes referred by amateur astronomers as the Owl Cluster or the E.T. Cluster (due to its resemblance to the movie character).
Two bright stars Phi Cassiopeiae (magnitude 5 and spectral type F0) and HD 7902 (magnitude 7) can be imagined as eyes. It is not yet clear if Phi Cassiopeiae is a member of the cluster, and if it is, then it would be one of the brightest stars known, surpassing Rigel in luminosity. For comparison, the Sun at the same distance as Phi Cassiopeiae would shine at just 17.3 magnitudes. The next brightest star is the red supergiant variable star V466 Cassiopeiae. The cluster features a rich field of about 150 stars of magnitudes 9-13. About 60 stars have been identified as true members of the cluster.

Gallery

References

External links
 
 
 

NGC 0457
NGC 0457
0457
013b
17871018